Šabanci may refer to a village in Bosniz and Herzegovina:

Šabanci (Goražde), a village in the municipality of Goražde
Šabanci (Ilijaš), a village in the municipality of Ilijaš
Šabanci (Trnovo), a village in the municipality of Trnovo